The flag of Saint Kitts and Nevis consists of a yellow-edged black band containing two white stars that divides diagonally from the lower hoist-side corner, with a green upper triangle and red lower triangle. Adopted in 1983 to replace the flag of Saint Christopher-Nevis-Anguilla, it has been the flag of the Federation of Saint Kitts and Nevis since the country gained independence that year.  Although the flag utilises the colours of the Pan-Africanist movement, the symbolism behind them is interpreted differently. The three islands later became part of the West Indies Federation in 1958; after this dissolved four years later, they were granted the status of associate state as Saint Christopher-Nevis-Anguilla.  However, Anguilla decided to secede from the federation in 1969, owing to fears that their population, which was already small, would be further marginalised in parliament. This was eventually formalised in 1980, and a new flag for the remaining parts of the federation was needed, since the symbolism of the previous flag centred on the concept of a union of three.

A national competition was held in the early 1980s to choose a new flag.  The winning design by student Edris Lewis was one of 258 entries.  It was first hoisted one minute after midnight on 19 September 1983, the day Saint Kitts and Nevis became an independent country.

Design

Symbolism
The colours and symbols of the flag carry cultural, political, and regional meanings.  The green alludes to the country's fertile land, while the red evokes the fight against slavery and colonialism.  The yellow stripes represent the sunshine the islands enjoy all year round, and the black epitomises the people's African origins.  The two stars on the black band symbolise the two islands as well as hope and liberty.  The official meaning behind the flag's symbols was formulated by Edris Lewis, the same person who designed the flag.

Flag of Nevis

The flag of Nevis island incorporates the flag of the Federation of Saint Kitts and Nevis in the top left corner.

The golden field stands for sunshine. The central triangle represents the conical shape of Nevis, with the blue being the ocean; the green being the verdant slopes of the island; and the white being the clouds that usually wreathe Nevis Peak.

Historical flags

References

 
Flag of Saint Kitts and Nevis
National flags
Flags adopted through competition
Flags introduced in 1983
1983 establishments in Saint Kitts and Nevis